John O'Connor (born 1965 in Piercetown, County Wexford) is an Irish former sportsperson. He played hurling with his local club St Martin's and with the Wexford senior inter-county team in the 1980s and 1990s. His brother George, and nephew John, also played hurling with Wexford.

References

1965 births
Living people
All-Ireland Senior Hurling Championship winners
St Martin's (Wexford) hurlers
Wexford inter-county hurlers